Our World in Data (OWID) is a scientific online publication that focuses on large global problems such as poverty, disease, hunger, climate change, war, existential risks, and inequality.

It is a project of the Global Change Data Lab, a registered charity in England and Wales, and was founded by Max Roser, a social historian and development economist. The research team is based at the University of Oxford.

Content 

Our World in Data uses interactive charts and maps to illustrate research findings, often taking a long-term view to show how global living conditions have changed over time.

History 

Roser began his work on the project in 2011, adding a research team at the University of Oxford later on. In the first years, Roser developed the publication together with inequality researcher Sir Tony Atkinson.  Hannah Ritchie joined in 2017 and became Head of Research.  Edouard Mathieu joined in 2020 and became Head of Data.  The organization began the COVID-19 pandemic with six staff members, and grew to 20 by late 2021.

In 2019, Our World in Data won the Lovie Award, a European web award, and was one of three nonprofit organizations in Y Combinator's Winter 2019 cohort.

Beginning in 2020, Our World in Data added an emphasis on publishing global data and research on the COVID-19 pandemic:
 They created and maintained a worldwide database on vaccinations for COVID-19, which was used as the source for data published by the World Health Organization, researchers and other international organizations, journals, and numerous newspapers.
 Similarly, the team built and maintained a global dataset on COVID-19 testing which was used by the United Nations, the White House, the World Health Organization, and epidemiologists and researchers, and also published data such as hospitalizations and computations of excess deaths. 

In 2021 the team began campaigning for the International Energy Agency to make the data it collects from national governments publicly available.

Funding and collaborations 

Global Change Data Lab, the non-profit that publishes Our World in Data and the open-access data tools that make the online publication possible, is funded through a mix of grants, sponsors, and reader donations. 

 The first grant to support the research project was given by the Nuffield Foundation, a London-based foundation focused on social policy.
 Other grantors supporting the project have included the Quadrature Climate Foundation, the Bill and Melinda Gates Foundation, and a grant from German philanthropist Susanne Klatten. Sponsors have included Longview Philanthropy, the Effective Altruism Meta Fund, and the Musk Foundation, with further individual donations from Jamie Metzl and YouTuber Hank Green.
 Reader donations are also a major source of funding. In 2020, more than 3,000 individuals supported the project, exceeding 4,000 donors by 2023.

The research team collaborated with the science YouTube channel Kurzgesagt.

In the coronavirus pandemic, the team partnered with epidemiologists from Harvard's Chan School of Public Health and the Robert Koch Institute to study countries that have responded successfully in the early phase of the pandemic. Janine Aron and John Muellbauer worked with OWID to research excess mortality during the pandemic.

FTX's Future Fund offered Our World in Data a $7.5 million grant to support their activities. Max Rosen claimed the grant was declined, despite the FTX Foundation continuing to list the funds as having been awarded.

Usage 
In 2021, the Our World in Data website had 89 million unique visitors.

Our World in Data has been cited in academic scientific journals, medicine and global health journals, and social science journals. The Washington Post, The New York Times, and The Economist have used Our World in Data as a source.

The site uses copyleft licenses to allow others to copy, modify, and distribute the work (CC-BY for content and the MIT License for software).

See also
 Effective altruism
 Gapminder Foundation

References

External links 

 
 History of Our World in Data

Statistical service organizations
Publications
Online publishing
Development economics
Data visualization software
World population
Creative Commons-licensed works
Publications associated with the University of Oxford